Pizza is a popular Italian dish.

Pizza may also refer to:

Films
Pizza (2005 film), a film starring Kylie Sparks and Ethan Embry
Pizza (2012 film), a Tamil thriller film starring Vijay Sethupathi and Remya Nambesan
Pizza (2014 film), a Hindi thriller film starring Akshay Oberoi, Parvathy Omanakuttan and Dipannita Sharma

Music
Pizza (album), a 1981 album by Alain Bashung
Pizza (EP), a 2006 EP by Horse the Band
"Pizza" (song), a 2017 song by Martin Garrix

Television
Pizza (TV series), an Australian TV series
The Pizza, an episode from the third season of The Amazing World of Gumball

Other uses
Pizza (programming language)
Pizza Connection Trial
Pizzagate conspiracy theory

See also

 
 
 List of pizza chains
 List of pizza franchises
 List of pizza varieties
 &pizza (and pizza), U.S. fast casual restaurant chain
 Pizza Pizza, Canadian fast food pizzeria chain
 The Pizza Company, Thailand pizzeria chain
 Mr. Pizza, South Korean pizza chain
 Mister Pizza, Brazilian pizza chain
 Pizza Guy (disambiguation)
 Pizzaboy (disambiguation)
 Pizzaman (disambiguation)
 Pissa (disambiguation)
 Pisa (disambiguation)